The Limahuli Garden and Preserve is a  and  on the north shore of Kauai island, Hawaii. It is one of the five gardens of the non-profit National Tropical Botanical Garden.

Description
Limahuli lies within a tropical valley covering three distinct ecological zones. The name comes from lima huli which means "turned hand" in the Hawaiian language.

The garden contains a wide range of native and Polynesian-introduced plants, including kukui (Aleurites moluccana), banana, breadfruit, alula (Brighamia insignis), Paper Mulberry (Broussonetia papyrifera), papala (Charpentiera elliptica), kī (Cordyline fruticosa), turmeric (Curcuma domestica), hāhā (Cyanea hardyi), lama (Diospyros sandwicensis), vegetable fern (Diplazium esculentum), ginger, hau kuahiwi (Hibiscadelphus distans), hibiscus including kokio keokeo (Hibiscus waimeae), kava, koa (Acacia koa), nehe (Lipochaeta succulenta), ōhia lehua (Metrosideros polymorpha), pokulakalaka (Munroidendron racemosum), kului (Nototrichium divaricatum), hala (Pandanus tectorius), pāpala kēpau (Pisonia wagneriana), plumeria, loulu (Pritchardia limahuliensis), sugarcane, taro, and iliau (Wilkesia gymnoxiphium).

It includes taro terraces (loi kalo) that date back to early Polynesian arrivals on the island. These were part of an ancient ahupuaʻa, a sophisticated land-management and food-production system.

In 1997 Limahuli Garden was selected by the American Horticultural Society as the best natural botanical garden in the United States. In 2007, it received the top "Keep It Hawaii" award from the Hawaii Tourism Authority for its support of the Hawaiian culture, protection and development of Hawaiian knowledge by preservation of natural resources through research, hands-on work, and educational opportunities.

Limahuli Garden is open to visitors. An admission fee is charged. The preserve area is not open to the public. 
The preserve was established with  donated by Juliet Rice Wichman in 1967 and extended by her grandson Charles "Chipper" Rice Wichman, who were descended from businessman William Hyde Rice and missionary William Harrison Rice. Mount Makana which rises above Limahuli Valley is sometimes called Bali Ha'i, a name used in the 1958 film South Pacific which was filmed on location in the area.

See also 
 National Tropical Botanical Garden
 McBryde Garden
 Allerton Garden
 Kahanu Garden
 The Kampong
 List of botanical gardens in the United States

References

External links 

 Limahuli Garden and Preserve'
 National Tropical Botanical Garden

Botanical gardens in Hawaii
Protected areas of Kauai
Protected areas established in 1967
1967 establishments in Hawaii